Shaban Bantariza (1963 – 27 October 2020) was a Colonel in the Uganda People's Defense Force (UPDF). He served as the deputy director of the Uganda Media Centre and deputy government spokesperson, from June 2015.

Background and education
Bantariza was born in Mitooma District in Uganda's Western Region, circa 1963. He attended St. Leo's College, Kyegobe, in Fort Portal, Kabarole District for his O-Level studies. He then joined the Catholic brotherhood, where he trained as an elementary school teacher.

While pursuing a course at Makerere University in 1985, he abandoned his studies and joined the National Resistance Army, led by Yoweri Museveni. He attended guerrilla bootcamp in the Kabarore area, in foothills of the Rwenzori Mountains. He also attended and graduated from the Uganda Senior Command and Staff College, having studied the senior command course offered annually at the college.

Career
Bantariza served as the UPDF spokesperson from 2000 to 2002 and from 2003 to 2006. For a period of time, prior to February 2009, Bantariza, at the rank of lieutenant colonel, served as the commander of the Oliver Tambo Leadership School, in Kaweweta, Nakaseke District, in Uganda's Central Region. On 26 February 2009, he was appointed commandant of the National Leadership Institute (NALI), in Kyankwanzi, Kyankwanzi District. He served in that capacity until he was relieved of his duties on 7 October 2011.

In June 2013, he was appointed Deputy Executive Director of the National Media Centre. On 2 July 2013, at the rank of colonel, he was arrested, charged with embezzlement and remanded to Makindye Military prison by the General Court Martial on charges of alleged fraud. After proceedings that lasted nearly three years, the Court Martial, chaired by Major General Levi Karuhanga, acquitted Colonel Bantariza due to lack of evidence against him, on 14 April 2015. On 24 June 2015, following his acquittal by the general court martial, he resumed work at the Uganda Media Centre, the president of Uganda having directed in writing that Bantariza resumes work.

Retirement from the UPDF
On 28 September 2015, Bantariza retired from the UPDF. He continued to serve as the deputy government spokesperson until his death on 27 October 2020.

Death
He died on 27 October 2020, at Mulago National Referral Hospital, where he had been admitted two days before, complaining of chest discomfort, fatigue and cough. Before his death, his samples had tested positive for COVID-19. He also suffered from diabetes mellitus and systemic hypertension.

See also
 Aronda Nyakairima
 Felix Kulayigye
 Nobel Mayombo
 Uganda Ministry of Information and Communications Technology

References

External links
Website of Uganda Media Centre

1963 births
2020 deaths
Ugandan military personnel
Ugandan civil servants
People from Mitooma District
Uganda Senior Command and Staff College alumni
Makerere University alumni
People from Western Region, Uganda
Deaths from the COVID-19 pandemic in Uganda
People educated at St. Leo's College, Kyegobe